Denis William Cashmore (21 May 1907 – 13 October 1982) was a footballer for Watford Football Club, like his father George Cashmore before him. He played for the club from 1928 until 1932.

References

Sources
 Watford Association Football Club Official Journal - Watford v. Fulham, 30 November 1929.

Watford F.C. players
1907 births
1982 deaths
People from Aldenham
English footballers
Association footballers not categorized by position